Tropisternus is a genus of hydrophilid beetles with 63 species in five subgenera in North and South America.

Species
 Subgenus Homostethus
 Tropisternus cordieri Orchymont, 1922
 Tropisternus falli Orchymont, 1922
 Tropisternus metallescens Orchymont, 1922
 Subgenus Pleurhomus
 Tropisternus sahlbergi (Sharp, 1883)
 Subgenus Pristoternus
 Tropisternus acaragua Bachmann, 1970
 Tropisternus apicipalpis (Chevrolat, 1834)
 Tropisternus azurescens Orchymont, 1921
 Tropisternus baeri Orchymont, 1921
 Tropisternus breviceps Sharp, 1883
 Tropisternus brevicollis Sharp, 1882
 Tropisternus bruchi Orchymont, 1921
 Tropisternus chalybeus Castelnau, 1840
 Tropisternus chontalensis Sharp, 1882
 Tropisternus crassus Sharp, 1882
 Tropisternus dilatatus Bruch, 1915
 Tropisternus ebenus (Klug, 1829)
 Tropisternus flavipalpis Sharp, 1883
 Tropisternus gaeae Bachmann, 1969
 Tropisternus laevis (Sturm, 1826)
 Tropisternus latus (Brullé, 1837)
 Tropisternus mergus Say, 1835
 Tropisternus missionum Fernández & Bachmann, 2000
 Tropisternus mutatus Orchymont, 1921
 Tropisternus noa Fernández & Bachmann, 2000
 Tropisternus obesus Bruch, 1915
 Tropisternus oculatus Sharp, 1882
 Tropisternus ovalis Castelnau, 1840
 Tropisternus paredesi Leech, 1943
 Tropisternus phyllisae Spangler & Short, 2008
 Tropisternus regimbarti Orchymont, 1921
 Tropisternus robustus Sharp, 1883
 Tropisternus sanapana Bachmann, 1970
 Tropisternus variolosus Hansen, 1999

 Subgenus Strepitornus
 Tropisternus collaris (Fabricius, 1775)
 Tropisternus niger Orchymont, 1938
 Tropisternus parananus Sharp, 1883
 Subgenus Tropisternus
 Tropisternus affinis Motschulsky, 1859
 Tropisternus blatchleyi Orchymont, 1922
 Tropisternus burmeisteri Fernández & Bachmann, 1980
 Tropisternus californicus (LeConte, 1855)
 Tropisternus carinispina Orchymont, 1922
 Tropisternus columbianus Brown, 1931
 Tropisternus flavescens Orchymont, 1922
 Tropisternus fuscitarsis Sharp, 1882
 Tropisternus glaber (Herbst, 1797)
 Tropisternus ignoratus Knisch, 1921
 Tropisternus jolyi Spangler, 1981
 Tropisternus knischi Orchymont, 1943
 Tropisternus lancifer Sharp, 1883
 Tropisternus lateralis (Fabricius, 1775)
 Tropisternus longispina Fernández & Bachmann, 1980
 Tropisternus mixtus (LeConte, 1855)
 Tropisternus natator Orchymont, 1938
 Tropisternus obscurus Sharp, 1882
 Tropisternus orvus Leech, 1945
 Tropisternus quadristriatus (Horn, 1871)
 Tropisternus richmondi Spangler & Short, 2008
 Tropisternus salsamentus Fall, 1901
 Tropisternus setiger (Germar, 1824)
 Tropisternus sharpi Orchymont, 1922
 Tropisternus sublaevis (LeConte, 1855)
 Tropisternus surinamensis Spangler & Short, 2008
 Tropisternus tinctus Sharp, 1882

References

Hydrophilidae genera
Hydrophilinae